The APT-E, for Advanced Passenger Train Experimental, was the prototype Advanced Passenger Train tilting train unit. It was powered by gas turbines, the only multiple unit so powered that was used by British Rail. The APT-E consisted of two driving power cars (PC1 and 2) and two trailer cars (TC1 and 2). Each power car was equipped with four Rover-built Leyland 2S/350 gas turbines (and a fifth for auxiliary power supplies), which initially produced 300 hp each but were progressively uprated to 330 hp. Two GEC 253AY nose suspended traction motors provided the traction on the leading bogies.

The APT-E made its first run on 25 July 1972 from Derby to Duffield and was immediately 'blacked' by the drivers' union ASLEF, due to concerns that the single driver's seat pre-empted ongoing negotiations about the single-manning of trains. It was over twelve months before it ran again on the main line in August 1973.

The prototype was eventually tried out on the Great Western Main Line, and achieved a new British railway speed record when on 10 August 1975 it hit  whilst on test with the Western Region between Swindon and Reading.

The unit was only intended for testing and was never used in ordinary public service, although it did carry office staff and the occasional dignitary on trial runs. When its period of testing was complete, in June 1976, it was sent to the National Railway Museum, York for preservation. It is now based at the NRM's Locomotion museum in Shildon. When further APT Class 370 units were built, they were powered by 25 kV AC electrification.

Test bed set
The APT-POP (Power-0-Power) set was a rake of three skeletal unpowered carriages used as a test bed for the suspension, tilting and braking systems used by APT units. The 'Power pumps' were only mock-ups, though similar externally to PC1 and PC2 in the APT-E unit minus cabs, and the whole set had to be hauled by a locomotive. Following the abandonment of the APT project, all three carriages were scrapped in 1985. The set was formed as follows:

Number:  RDB975634 - RDB975636 - RDB975635
Identity:  PC3   - Lab 8  -  PC4

See also
Advanced Passenger Train
British Rail Class 370
Gas turbine locomotive

References

Notes

Sources 
 Potter, Stephen (1987). On the Right Lines?: The limits of technological innovation. London: Frances Pinter (Publishers). .
 
 N/A, (1981). Advanced Passenger Train: The official illustrated account of British Rail's revolutionary new 155mph train. Weston-super-Mare: Avon-Anglia Publications & Services. .
 British Transport Films (1975) E for Experimental republished 2006 by the British Film Institute on DVD as part of British Transport Films Collection (Vol. 3): Running A Railway.

External links
 Pauls Railway Web APT-E
 Testing the APT-E at Old Dalby and on the main line
 Locomotion : The National Railway Museum at Shildon - NRM website
 Locomotion : The National Railway Museum at Shildon - Sedgefield Council Website
 departmentals.com (Type APT in the search box)

Experimental locomotives
High-speed trains of the United Kingdom
APT-E
British Railways gas turbine locomotives
Experimental and prototype high-speed trains
British Rail Departmental Units
British Rail research and development
Gas turbine multiple units with locomotive-like power cars
Abandoned trains of the United Kingdom
Train-related introductions in 1972